The 1996–97 Gamma Ethniki was the 14th season since the official establishment of the third tier of Greek football in 1983. Ethnikos Asteras and Anagennisi Karditsa were crowned champions in Southern and Northern Group respectively, thus winning promotion to Beta Ethniki. Kallithea and ILTEX Lykoi also won promotion as a runners-up of the groups.

Ilisiakos, Atromitos, Irodotos, Patra, Enosis Rodos-Diagoras, Varvasiakos, Almopos Aridea, Lamia, Iraklis Ptolemaida, Anagennisi Giannitsa, Nigrita and Anagennisi Kolindros were relegated to Delta Ethniki.

Southern Group

League table

Northern Group

League table

References

Third level Greek football league seasons
3
Greece